Sadiq El Fitouri (born 10 October 1994) is a Libyan professional footballer who plays as a defender. He has also been capped by the Libya national team.

He predominantly plays as a right-back, but he can also operate as a centre-back. He began his career in the Manchester City youth system, subsequently moving to Salford City, before joining Manchester United in January 2015. He had a short stint at Chesterfield in 2017 after being released by Manchester United before joining Al Ahli Tripoli in July 2017. He signed for Politehnica Iași in January 2018 where he remained for only two months due to injuries.

Early life
El Fitouri was born in Libya, and raised in Old Trafford, Greater Manchester, England. During his time studying at Stretford High School, he was a member of the school's trophy-winning football team, which also progressed to a national cup final. During a season in the school's under-14 team, El Fitouri's father once stopped him from playing due to declining grades, but he subsequently returned to playing football after his grades improved.

Club career

Manchester City
After leaving school, El Fitouri and two friends joined Manchester City, but all three were subsequently released. El Fitouri spent around a year with the club's youth setup. He was described as a player that could cope physically, but was not the best in the other aspects of the game. He was deemed as a late developer and did not manage to break into the club's first-team squad during his time there.

Salford City
Following his release from Manchester City's youth system, El Fitouri participated only in recreational football, before joining Salford City after a successful trial in December 2014. On 3 January 2015, he made his first-team debut for the club, in a Division One North tie against Kendal Town that ended 2–1. His debut match would turn out to be his only appearance for the Northern Premier League club. Several weeks prior to the match, the club had sacked incumbent manager, Phil Power. Part-owners Phil Neville and Paul Scholes had stepped in as caretakers for the club during the period, and were impressed with El Fitouri during training and his performance in the match against Kendal Town, prompting the pair to recommend El Fitouri to their former club's under-21 manager, Warren Joyce.

Manchester United
Through the recommendations of Neville and Scholes, El Fitouri was offered a week-long trial at the Trafford Training Centre. His performance during the trial prompted the club to offer him a contract. On 30 January 2015, El Fitouri signed an 18-month contract with Manchester United, entering the club's under-21 team.

On 23 February 2015, El Fitouri made his debut for the Manchester United under-21 team, in a match against the Sunderland under-21 team, which ended 1–1. He made three more appearances for the team in the 2014–15 season of the Professional Development League, where the Manchester United under-21 team went on to be crowned champions for the season. He was named in the senior 25-man squad for the 2016–17 Premier League season.

Chesterfield
El Fitouri signed for League One club Chesterfield on 2 February 2017, after being released by Manchester United. He made his debut two days later on 4 February 2017 in a 1–0 home defeat to Oldham Athletic. El Fitouri started the next game on 11 February 2017 against Northampton Town, losing 3–1.  After that game he was given several days off for personal reasons and failed to contact or arrive at the proact, despite Chesterfield attempting to contact the player, and was subsequently released by the club at the end of the season.

Al-Ahli Sports Club
After being released by Chesterfield, El Fitouri returned to the country of his birth and joined reigning Libyan Premier League champions Al-Ahli Tripoli on 29 July 2017.

Politehnica Iași
El Fitouri returned to Europe after signing for Romanian club Politehnica Iași on 30 January 2018. However injuries prevented him from playing and subsequently had his contract terminated on 28 March, only two months after joining, with Iași wishing him the best of luck.

Al-Hilal Omdurman
On 14 March 2019, El Fitouri signed for Sudanese club Al-Hilal Omdurman on a two year deal.

International career
On 6 June 2015, El Fitouri made his full international debut for Libya after being included in the starting line-up by national coach Javier Clemente for a friendly match against Mali. A week later, on 12 June 2015, El Fitouri made his first competitive appearance for Libya in a 2017 Africa Cup of Nations qualification match against Morocco. He played in his preferred right-back role for the full 90 minutes, with the match ending in a 1–0 defeat.

Career statistics

Club

International

References

1994 births
Living people
English people of Libyan descent
People from Benghazi
Libyan footballers
Association football defenders
Libya international footballers
English Football League players
Liga I players
Salford City F.C. players
Manchester United F.C. players
Chesterfield F.C. players
Al-Ahli SC (Tripoli) players
Al-Hilal Club (Omdurman) players
FC Politehnica Iași (2010) players
Libyan expatriate footballers
Libyan emigrants to the United Kingdom
Libyan expatriates in the United Kingdom
Expatriate footballers in England
Libyan expatriate sportspeople in Romania
Expatriate footballers in Romania
Libyan expatriate sportspeople in Sudan
Expatriate footballers in Sudan
Libyan Premier League players